Loïc Mevel is a French Polynesian long-distance runner who has represented French Polynesia at the Pacific Games. He is the son of long-distance runner Elodie Menou.

At the 2015 Oceania Athletics Championships in Cairns he won silver in the 10,000 meters. At the 2015 Pacific Games in Port Moresby he won bronze in the 5,000 meters. At the 2016 Polynesian Championships in Athletics in Papeete he won gold in both the 5,000 meters and 10,000 meters.

References

Living people
French Polynesian long-distance runners
Year of birth missing (living people)